Joseph Willcocks (1773 – September 4, 1814) sometimes spelt Wilcox was a publisher and political figure in Upper Canada. He was elected to the Parliament of Upper Canada in 1807 representing York, 1st Lincoln and Haldimand. He was re-elected twice and frequently opposed government policies. He became disillusioned with Upper Canada after a military rule was introduced to Upper Canada during the War of 1812 and defected to the United States. He was mortally shot on September 4, 1814 at Fort Erie, and buried in Buffalo, New York.

Early life
He was born in Palmerstown, Ireland in 1773. He was the second son to Robert Willcocks and Jane Powell. During the Irish Rebellion of 1798 he was loyal to the British Empire.

He came to York on March 20, 1800.

Career

York
On May 1, 1800 he was hired to be the private clerk of Peter Russell, who was a distant cousin. He later became a receiver and payer of fees for the Office of the Surveyor General. He was dismissed from this role when Russell's half-sister revealed their romantic relationship. Henry Allcock hired Willcocks as a clerk and William Jarvis employed him to engrave deeds. On May 9, 1803, he was appointed as registrar of the probate court and marshall for the courts of assizes.

In 1804, Willcocks became sheriff for the Home District. He was active in an 1806 by-election for Robert Thorpe, a friend and neighbour. Willcocks and Thorpe were concerned about changes in government policies regarding land grants, which were controlled by the Executive Council, an appointed body. As a result of these criticisms, Lieutenant Governor Francis Gore removed Thorpe from office and withdrew Willcocks' appointment as sheriff in 1807, citing "general and notorious bad conduct".

Niagara

Willcocks moved to Niagara where he began to publish The Upper Canada Guardian; or Freeman's Journal. He used the newspaper to criticise the government and voice his opposition to Upper Canada's land laws. In 1807, he was elected in a by-election for West York, 1st Lincoln & Haldimand after the death of Solomon Hill. During the 4th Parliament, he was jailed for contempt of the house. He was re-elected in 1808 to 1st Lincoln and Haldimand and became the leader of the parliamentary opposition. His political positions in this session included lower salaries for public servants, less regulations for loyalists and military personnel to obtain land and more regulation on election procedures. During the last session of the 5th Parliament, Willcocks and his group successfully resisted efforts by Isaac Brock to pass a number of measures preparing for the expected war with the United States.

Willcocks was a member of the Freemasonry in the Niagara Lodge.

Brock called an election in 1812 to obtain a legislature that would support his war preparations. Willcocks was reelected for the rising of 1st Lincoln and Haldimand. In June 1812 he sold his printing press to Richard Hatt. Brock enlisted Willcocks's help to secure the loyalty and participation of the Six Nations peoples to the British Crown in the upcoming war and Willcocks was successful despite his poor health. He fought in the Battle of Queenston Heights and recruited for the Canadian militia.

In early June 1813 hardline loyalists were upset with Willcock's opposition to giving extended powers to the government. They spread a rumour that Willcocks was working with American forces in their invasion to Stoney Creek.

Defection to United States

Disillusionment with British rule
Willcocks was disturbed when military rule and harsh measures against people expressing disloyal opinions were introduced in the province. Willcocks saw this as an abandonment of democratic principles in the province. In July 1813 he committed treason and travelled to the United States to join the Americans. He was made a major in the American army and commanded a company of Canadian Volunteers consisting of expatriate Canadians fighting on the American side.

Conducting Operations in Canada
In the fall of 1813 George McClure appointed Willcocks as the police officer of Niagara. In this capacity, Willcocks regulated the movements of the city's citizens and interrogated prisoners.

Raid at Newark
On December 10, 1813. Joseph Wilocks conducted a raid with 100 armed members of his militia and 70 U.S. Regulars. Joseph Willocks marched on his horse while leading his column. Wilocks and his force burned more than 60 structures of public and private property. Wilocks recruited 4 Canadians who joined him. And Wilocks withdrew to New York with 24 prisoners.

Sabotaging the bridge at Tonawanda Creek
A large British raiding force led by Phineas Riall was headed towards Buffalo. The Canadian Volunteers under Joseph Wilocks sabotaged the bridge at Tonawanda Creek by burning it down to delay the British advance. Although it did delay the British for a while, the British eventually made it to Buffalo and successfully raided it. A number of Canadian volunteers did fight side by side with the New York Militia fighting the British before withdrawing back from the field making the British victors. Though the British won the engagement, they suffered many casualties.

Raid on Saint David’s
On July 22, 1814. Joseph Wilcocks with 200-300 men which included American dragoons made a surprise raid on Saint David’s where there were 4 Canadian militiamen. The Americans under Wilcocks came around by the mountain and surrounded the house where the Canadian militiamen were staying. The Canadian militiamen fired through the windows with their muskets killing 1 American dragoon and wounding a few horses. The Canadian militiamen refused to surrender until the American dragoon captain Harrison stepped forward into the open and persuaded the Canadian militiamen to surrender. The Canadian militia surrendered. Joseph Wilcocks and his fellow American raiders destroyed the house that the Canadian militia took shelter in. Then Wilcocks and his fellow raiders withdrew back to American territory with their 4 Canadian prisoners.

Marked for treason
In the spring of 1814 fifteen Upper Canadians, including Willcocks, were charged with high treason as part of the Ancaster Bloody Assize.

Death

On September 4, 1814, during the Siege of Fort Erie. Joseph Willocks led a sortie against a British battery. After 6 hours of fighting, the sortie raiding force under Joseph Wilocks withdrew with Joseph getting killed. His body was buried initially in "the circle or open square of that village (Buffalo, New York)" and reburied in Forest Lawn Cemetery in the 1830s.

Further reading
 William Renwick Riddell (1927) Joseph Willcocks: Sheriff, Member of Parliament and Traitor, Toronto.
 Donald Graves (1982) Joseph Willcocks and the Canadian Volunteers: An Account of Political Disaffection in Upper Canada during the War of 1812, Carleton University.
 Pierre Berton (1980), The Invasion of Canada, 1812—1813, Toronto:  McClelland and Stewart.  
 Pierre Berton (1981), Flames across the Border, 1813—1814, Toronto:  McClelland and Stewart.

Notes

1773 births
1814 deaths
Members of the Legislative Assembly of Upper Canada
Canadian people of the War of 1812
Irish emigrants to pre-Confederation Ontario
British defectors to the United States
People from Niagara-on-the-Lake
Deaths by firearm in Ontario
Burials at Forest Lawn Cemetery (Buffalo)
Immigrants to Upper Canada